The Robert and Missouri Garbutt House in Lyons, Georgia, also known as Twenty Columns, is a historic Classical Revival-style house built in 1908–1910.  It was built by architect/builder Ivey P. Crutchfield.

It is located prominently on GA SR 30/U.S. 280, the main east–west route through Lyons.

Other contributing buildings on the property are a carriage house (c.1900) and a servant's
house (c.1920).

References

External links
 

Houses on the National Register of Historic Places in Georgia (U.S. state)
Neoclassical architecture in Georgia (U.S. state)
Houses completed in 1908
Houses in Toombs County, Georgia